Calders is a municipality in the comarca of the Moianès in Catalonia, Spain. Until May 2015 it was part of Bages.

References

External links

Official website 
 Government data pages 

Municipalities in Moianès